The 2014 Nigeria Professional Football League was the 43rd season of the competition since its inception, and the 24th since the rebranding of the league as the "Professional League".
The season was scheduled to kick off on November 22, about one month after the conclusion of the 2013 season.
However, on that date the league's start was postponed to mid-February until after the 2014 African Nations Championship and to allow the teams to complete all their FIFA licensing. It was delayed again until March.

Clubs
Sixteen teams from the previous season and four teams promoted from the Nigeria National League (Crown F.C., Giwa FC, Taraba F.C. and Abia Warriors F.C.) are participating in this season. With Abia Warriors debuting it means the Abia State derby with Enyimba will feature at the highest level of Nigerian football for the first time.

Table

News
- On February 21, Sunshine Stars F.C. was involved in an accident on the road between Ijebu-Ode and Akure. Five players and the team masseur went to the hospital with serious injuries. However, nobody was killed.
- On the eve of the league start, Giwa F.C. and Nembe City (the last two Nigeria National League champions and the league's only two privately funded clubs) were withdrawn from league fixtures by the LMC for failing to provide guarantees of the minimum salary for players, leaving the league at 18 teams. Both teams appealed to be reinstated on March 20. Giwa was admitted back on the 2nd of April and Nembe City was readmitted the next day.
- After the Week 1 games, Abia Warriors refused to travel to Maiduguri to play El-Kanemi Warriors, citing fears for safety after recent Boko Haram attacks. The league then refused to sanction games there, and El Kanemi nominally agreed to move games this season to Kano.
- The Week 26 fixtures were suspended when the Nigeria Referees Association went on strike. The league resumed 17 September.

Managerial (head coach) changes

Top scorers
 23 goals
 Mfon Udoh Enyimba FC

References 

Nigeria Professional Football League seasons
Nigeria
1